The Riedbahn (Ried Railway) refers to various railways in southern Hesse, Germany:

 the Darmstadt–Worms railway (original route),
 the Mannheim–Frankfurt railway (current route),
 the western section of the Weinheim–Worms railway (former connecting line),
 the Western Entrance to the Riedbahn,
 Riedbahn, a suburb of Weiterstadt, Hesse.